Juan de Dios Hernández Tagle (born 4 January 1986) is a former Mexican football player who last played for  Zacatepec in the Ascenso MX.

He made his debut with Cruz Azul on August 13, 2005, in a winning match against Tecos, 5–1.

References

External links

Facts at Televisa Deportes

Televisa Deportes

1986 births
Living people
Mexican footballers
Mexican expatriate footballers
Cruz Azul footballers
Atlante F.C. footballers
Chiapas F.C. footballers
Club Necaxa footballers
Club Puebla players
C.D. Veracruz footballers
Irapuato F.C. footballers
Dorados de Sinaloa footballers
Club Tijuana footballers
Atlas F.C. footballers
L.D. Alajuelense footballers
Lobos BUAP footballers
Liga MX players
Liga FPD players
Expatriate footballers in Costa Rica
Footballers from Mexico City
Association football midfielders